A heat pump is a device used to warm and sometimes also cool buildings by transferring thermal energy.

Types of heat pumps used for buildings include:
Air source heat pump
Exhaust air heat pump
Ground source heat pump (or geothermal heat pump)
Solar-assisted heat pump

Heat pump may also refer to:
Absorption heat pump
Direct exchange geothermal heat pump
Heat pump and refrigeration cycle
Hot air engine

See also
District heating
Drammen Heat Pump
Magnetic refrigeration
Stirling engine
Thermoacoustic heat engine
Thermoelectric cooling (or Peltier heat pump)
Vortex tube

Heat pumps
Energy technology
Energy conversion